You Are What You Eat is a British television programme produced during 2004–2006 and 2022–present.

You Are What You Eat may also refer to following:

"You Are What You Eat", a proverbial phrase

Art, entertainment and media
You Are What You Eat (film), a 1968 American counterculture semi-documentary movie
Jste to, co jíte (You Are What You Eat), Czech TV show by Prima televize
 You Are What You Eat, art project by Sarah DeRemer
You are What You Eat, 2001 film installation by Mina Shum

Music
You Are What You Eat, 1994 album by Sack (band)
"You Are What You Eat", track on 1998 album The Technology of Tears by Fred Frith
"You Are What You Eat", track on 2003 Home (Keller Williams album)
"You Are What You Eat", track on 2011 children's music album Radio Wayne by Wayne Brady
"看見什麼吃什麼" ("You Are What You Eat"), track on 2009 Mandarin album Senses Around by Yoga Lin

Other uses
You Are What You Eat, 1940 health food book by Victor Lindlahr
"You Are What You Eat", one of the 2005 Royal Institution Christmas Lectures

See also
Pajama Sam 3: You Are What You Eat from Your Head to Your Feet, a computer game